Sphaerium novaezelandiae is a very small freshwater clam, an aquatic bivalve mollusc, in the family Sphaeriidae, sometimes known as the fingernail clams.
Its native to New Zealand

References
 Powell A. W. B., New Zealand Mollusca, William Collins Publishers Ltd, Auckland, New Zealand 1979 

Bivalves of New Zealand
novaezelandiae
Bivalves described in 1854